Toledo Area Regional Transit Authority (TARTA) is a public transit agency that has been transporting people in the Toledo area of Ohio since 1971. TARTA services 32 bus routes in and around the Toledo metropolitan area serving nine communities and carries approximately 3.5 million passengers each year. Every TARTA bus uses biodiesel fuel, and is equipped with bicycle racks. All are wheelchair accessible. The transit authority also has special buses designed especially for disabled riders called TARPS (Toledo Area Regional Paratransit Service), which acts along the lines of the Americans with Disabilities Act.

In 2013, TARTA launched TARTA Tracker, which uses satellites and predictive computer software to identify bus locations in real-time and to anticipate arrival times of buses at various stops, also in real-time. TARTA Tracker is available in a desktop/laptop edition, mobile edition – both at www.TARTATracker.com – and a phone edition at 419-243-RIDE (7433).

In summer 2009, TARTA added 40 new buses to its fleet, including 10 mini- and 18 full-sized buses, in addition to 11 expanded buses for its TARPS fleet. The new buses were purchased with $7 million in federal money.

In April 2018, the University of Toledo agreed to transfer the management of its busing service to TARTA as a cost-saving measure. As part of the deal, TARTA will provide free rides on any bus to all UT students, faculty, and staff.

In 2019, TARTA announced plans for a three-year pilot program to transport passengers on an autonomous shuttle. It would have been funded by a $1.8 million federal grant. Due to regulatory limitations with federal grants, the plan for the autonomous shuttle had to be postponed.

In August 2022, fare collection resumed at pre-COVID rates systemwide.

Routes

The buses have routes in Toledo and its suburbs, including Maumee, Ottawa Hills, Rossford, Sylvania, Sylvania Township, and Waterville. This includes service to Fifth Third Field for all Toledo Mud Hens home baseball games and the Huntington Center for all home Toledo Walleye hockey games, as well as throughout Lourdes University, Owens Community College, and the University of Toledo. Call-A-Ride service is available in each of these locations.

Green Initiatives
 All TARTA buses fueled by biodiesel
 TARTA Participated in a study conducted by the Intermodal Transportation Institute at The University of Toledo to investigate the impacts of using a mixture of renewable biofuel and diesel fuel
 TARPS facility features solar and geothermal technology
 Sustainability Commitment with the American Public Transportation Association
 TARTA is a member of the Toledo-Lucas County Sustainability Commission

References

External links
Toledo Area Regional Transit Authority

Bus transportation in Ohio
Companies based in Toledo, Ohio
Transit agencies in Ohio
1971 establishments in Ohio